is a railway station located in the city of Kakamigahara,  Gifu Prefecture,  Japan, operated by the private railway operator Meitetsu.

Lines

Station layout

Shin Kanō  Station has two ground-level opposed side platforms connected by a level crossing. The station is unattended.

Platforms

Adjacent stations

History
Shin Kanō Station opened on January 21, 1926.

Surrounding area
Shinkanō-juku

See also
 List of Railway Stations in Japan

External links

  

Railway stations in Japan opened in 1926
Stations of Nagoya Railroad
Railway stations in Gifu Prefecture
Kakamigahara, Gifu